These are the results of the men's 91 kg competition in weightlifting at the 1996 Summer Olympics in Atlanta.  A total of 25 athletes entered this event. Each weightlifter had three attempts for both the snatch and clean and jerk lifting methods.  The total of the best successful lift of each method was used to determine the final rankings and medal winners.

Results

References

Sources
 

091